La Maya is a mountain of the Pennine Alps, overlooking St-Martin in the canton of Valais. It lies between the Val d'Hérens and the Val de Réchy, west of the Becs de Bosson.

References

External links
 La Maya on Hikr

Mountains of the Alps
Mountains of Switzerland
Mountains of Valais
Two-thousanders of Switzerland